The Darbandikhan Dam is a multi-purpose embankment dam on the Diyala River in northern Sulaymaniyah Governorate, Iraq. It was constructed between 1956 and 1961. The purpose of the dam is irrigation, flood control, hydroelectric power production and recreation. Due to poor construction and neglect, the dam and its 249 MW power station have undergone several repairs over the years. A rehabilitation of the power station began in 2007 and was completed in 2013.

Background 
After the Harza Engineering Company of USA designed the dam, construction began in 1956. The reservoir began to fill in November 1961 and the dam was complete that same year. After the reservoir filled, several problems occurred. This and other slope failures are continually under repair. The bedrock beneath the dam has to be re-grouted and the crest of the dam settled too much, required it to be repaired. The rip-rap on the upstream face of the dam was also repaired in 1999 and 2000.

Between 1983 and 1985 the dam's power station was replaced by German (Polensky & Zöllner) and Japanese companies (Mitsui). The original 2 × 800 kW generators were replaced with the current power plant's 83 MW generators. The generators were commissioned in 1990 after the political situation in the country calmed. However, two of the generators were not commissioned correctly and the turbines suffered from severe cavitation. New spillway gates were installed between 1989 and 1990 after they were removed in 1988 because of the Iran–Iraq War. During the war, the spillway and substation were damaged from bombing. The power station was damaged from bombing in 1990 as well. In 2007, the World Bank began a US$35.36 million project to repair the Darbandikhan and Dokan Dams. Repairs to the Darbandikhan Dam cost $18.85 million and were completed in 2013 resulting in 100 percent power availability.

Design and operation 

The dam is located within a gorge on a foundation of sedimentary rocks. It is a rock-fill embankment type with a central clay core. Of that capacity,  is active (or useful) storage while  is dead storage.

To protect the dam from flooding, it is equipped with a controlled chute spillway on its right bank. It is controlled by three  x 15 m tainter gates. At the terminus of each chute there is a ski-jump to help dissipate energy. The dam's power plant is located at its toe and contains 3 x 83 MW Francis turbine-generators. Above the tail-race for each turbine is an irrigation outlet.

See also

 List of dams and reservoirs in Iraq
 List of power stations in Iraq

References

External links

Dams in Iraq
Dams on the Diyala (Sirwan) River
Hydroelectric power stations in Iraq
Rock-filled dams
Sulaymaniyah Governorate
Geography of Iraqi Kurdistan
Dams completed in 1961
1961 establishments in Iraq
Energy infrastructure completed in 1990